PZL M26 Iskierka or M26 Airwolf is a Polish trainer and aerobatic aircraft, designed at WSK PZL-Mielec (later PZL Mielec).

Design and development
The M26 Iskierka was conceived as an economical plane for civilian pilot training and primary selection of military pilots. It offers training in both VFR and IFR flying as well as aerobatics. Its construction is partly based upon the twin-engine PZL M-20 Mewa utility plane (Piper PA-34 Seneca II, built under licence in WSK-Mielec). It shares the vertical stabilizer, rudder and main landing gear with the Mewa, while the wings and tail part of fuselage are unified to some degree. The plane is constructed according to FAR-23 rules. The main designer was Krzysztof Piwek.

The second prototype was the more powerful M26-01 variant, powered by a  Lycoming AEIO-540-L1B5D engine, and first flew on June 24, 1987. It was tested in a military aviation school in Dęblin in 1992.

Only a short series of 9 aircraft were manufactured, of which one remains in Poland. The plane is still offered by the PZL Mielec and is certified in the US, Australia and Europe (EASA). In the USA it is offered under the name Airwolf or Air Wolf, and eight  were exported there, beginning from 1996. In 1998 two were delivered to the Venezuelan National Guard. There were plans to fit a Walter M601 turboprop engine, for eventual customers' demand, however it was determined that the changes to the airframe would be significant and the project was abandoned.

Description
The M26 Iskierka is a low-wing monoplane, conventional in layout, metal covered with a semi-monocoque fuselage. Rectangular single-spar wings. Crew of two, sitting in tandem, under a common canopy, with double controls (student in front, instructor in rear). The rear seat is raised by 15 cm. The canopy is dropped in emergency. Retractable tricycle landing gear. Three-blade propeller (1.9 m diameter). Fuel tanks in wings (377 L). The plane may be fitted with a camera gun and racks for two small bombs.

Operators

Specifications (M26 01)

See also

References

Krzysztof Piwek, Wiesław Tomecki: Samolot M26 Iskierka in: Polska Technika Lotnicza - Materiały Historyczne 10(3/2005) - a lecture given on 19-2-2005 in Muzeum Techniki, Warsaw 
 Lambert, Mark (ed.) Jane's All The World's Aircraft 1993–94. Coulsdon, UK:Jane's Data Division, 1993. .
 "Poland's Novel Tuitional Trio". Air International, Volume 32, No. 5, May 1987. pp. 227–231. .

External links

PZL Mielec page

1980s Polish civil trainer aircraft
1980s Polish military trainer aircraft
M26
Single-engined tractor aircraft
Low-wing aircraft
Aircraft first flown in 1986